MAX Bus Rapid Transit is a bus rapid transit system serving Fort Collins, Colorado. The service, operated by Transfort, consists of one route serving 12 stations on the  Mason Corridor Transitway between South Transit Center and Downtown Fort Collins, with stops near the Colorado State University campus. The MAX route includes sections of new dedicated bus guideway, as well as shared city streets; in some cases, the bus has priority signal access.

It opened on May 10, 2014, at a cost of $87 million, as the first bus rapid transit system in the state of Colorado. Service was free for the first three months, with fare collection starting August 25. Fares must be pre-paid online or by using a ticket machine at any stop. Tickets and passes may also be purchased at each of Transfort's transit stations. As of August 27, 2017, MAX and several supporting routes also operate on Sunday. In its first five years, the route provided 6.2 million rides and was lauded as a top-notch service for a city its size.

The Institute for Transportation and Development Policy (ITDP), under its BRT Standard, has given MAX a preliminary classification as a "Basic BRT" corridor.

Stations

South Transit Center
Harmony
Troutman
Horsetooth
Swallow
Drake
Spring Creek
Prospect
University (Colorado State University)
Laurel
Mulberry
Olive
Mountain
Downtown Transit Center

Service

MAX operates daily year-round, frequency depending on time of day, generally every 10–15 minutes Monday through Saturday and every 30 minutes on Sunday.

Each full-size (60' articulating) MAX bus can carry four bicycles inside—two standing and two hanging. Smaller MAX buses have a triple bike rack on the front, with room for one bike inside.

References

2014 establishments in Colorado
2014 in transport
Bus rapid transit in the United States
Bus transportation in Colorado
Transportation in Fort Collins, Colorado